Kamwendo is a surname. Notable people with the surname include: 

Joseph Kamwendo (born 1986), Malawian footballer and coach
Steven Kamwendo (born 1966), Malawian politician
Yankho Kamwendo (born 1978), Swedish TV personality and actor

Surnames of African origin